Bailey Johnson may refer to:

Bailey Johnson Sr., father of Maya Angelou and character in her books
Bailey Johnson Jr., brother of Maya Angelou and character in her books like “Brother”

Bailey–Johnson 150-metre race

See also